Yevhen Petrovych Terletskyi was a Ukrainian and Soviet politician, member of the Russian Constituent Assembly, People Commissar (narkom) of Justice, diplomat.

Terletskyi was born in a village of Lozovyi Yar (near Yahotyn) in a family of priest. He graduated Poltava Theological Seminary and later studied at a recently established Petrograd Psychoneurological Institute. In 1911 Terletskyi joined the Socialist Revolutionary Party. He was an active participant of revolutionary events of 1917 as a member of the Petrograd Soviet and a chairman of the Poltava soviet as a member of Left Socialist-Revolutionaries. Terletskyi was elected to the Russian Constituent Assembly from Poltava Governorate as a member of the Ukrainian Party of Socialist Revolutionaries.

With the establishment of People's Secretariat, in December 1917 Terletskyi was appointed as a people's secretary of land cultivation.

In 1918 he was involved in negotiations of the Treaty of Brest-Litovsk and later assassination of German field marshal Hermann von Eichhorn.

Terletskyi was one of founders of the Ukrainian party of left socialist-revolutionaries Borbysts (not to be confused with Borotbists).

External links
 Doroshko, M. Yevhen Terletskyi. Encyclopedia of History of Ukraine.

1892 births
1937 deaths
People from Kyiv Oblast
People from Poltava Governorate
Left socialist-revolutionaries
Russian Constituent Assembly members
Great Purge victims from Ukraine
Soviet rehabilitations